Berk İbrahim Uğurlu (born April 27, 1996) is a Turkish professional basketball player for Tofaş of the Basketbol Süper Ligi (BSL). Standing at 1.92 m (6 ft. 3  in.), and weighing 87 kg (192 lbs.), he plays at the point guard position.

Professional career
Uğurlu signed first professional contract with the Turkish club Fenerbahçe in 2012. On February 23, 2014, in a Turkish Super League win over Aliağa Petkim, he helped his team to win the game, with a 4 points, 8 assists, 3 rebounds, and 3 steals performance.

On July 3, 2017, Uğurlu was loaned to Pınar Karşıyaka for the 2017–18 season.

On June 25, 2019, he has signed 3-year contract with Tofaş of the Turkish Basketball Super League (BSL).

Turkish national team
Uğurlu was a member of the Turkish junior national teams. While playing for Turkey's junior national teams, he won gold medals at the following tournaments: the 2012 FIBA Europe Under-16 Championship, the 2013 FIBA Europe Under-18 Championship, and the 2014 FIBA Europe Under-18 Championship. He also one Bronze medals at the 2015 FIBA Under-19 World Championship, the 2015 FIBA Europe Under-20 Championship, and the 2016 FIBA Europe Under-20 Championship.

References

External links
 Berk Uğurlu at draftexpress.com
 Berk Uğurlu at eurobasket.com
 Berk Uğurlu at euroleague.net
 Berk Uğurlu at fiba.com (archive)
 Berk Uğurlu at fiba.com (game center)
 Berk Uğurlu at tblstat.net
  

1996 births
Living people
Fenerbahçe men's basketball players
Karşıyaka basketball players
Point guards
Basketball players from Istanbul
Tofaş S.K. players
Turkish men's basketball players